The Tycho Brahe Prize is awarded by the European Astronomical Society. Inaugurated in 2008, the prize is awarded annually in recognition of the pioneering development or exploitation of European astronomical instrumentation, or major discoveries based largely on such instruments.

Tycho Brahe Prize laureates 

The following persons have received the Tycho Brahe Prize:

See also
 List of astronomy awards
 Prizes named after people

References

External links
 European Astronomical Society

Astronomy in Europe
Astronomy prizes
Awards established in 2008
European science and technology awards